Heiko Laeßig (born 18 June 1968) is a German former professional footballer who played as a defender.

References

1968 births
Living people
Sportspeople from Magdeburg
East German footballers
German footballers
Association football defenders
KFC Uerdingen 05 players
1. FC Magdeburg players
FC Red Bull Salzburg players
Bundesliga players
2. Bundesliga players
Austrian Football Bundesliga players
DDR-Oberliga players
German expatriate footballers
Expatriate footballers in Austria
Footballers from Saxony-Anhalt